Cyclaneusma is a genus of fungi belonging to the family Marthamycetaceae.

The genus has cosmopolitan distribution.

Species:
 Cyclaneusma minus (Butin) DiCosmo, Peredo & Minter

References

Leotiomycetes
Leotiomycetes genera